The Münchner Illustrierte was a German magazine published in the Süddeutscher Verlag weekly since 1950, initially under the title "Neue Münchner Illustrierte". The Münchner Illustrierte merged in 1960 with Bunte. Photojournalists working for Münchner Illustrierte were Hannes Betzler, Heinz Hering, Max Scheler and Kurt Schraudenbach. Editors were Hans Habe in 1949, and Jochen Wilke in 1957.

References

External links

1950 establishments in West Germany
1960 disestablishments in West Germany
Defunct magazines published in Germany
German-language magazines
Magazines established in 1950
Magazines disestablished in 1960
Magazines published in Munich
News magazines published in Germany
Weekly magazines published in Germany